Mahasamund is one of the 90 Legislative Assembly constituencies of Chhattisgarh state in India. It is in Mahasamund district and is a part of Mahasamund Lok Sabha constituency.

Previously, Mahasamund was part of Madhya Pradesh Legislative Assembly, until the state of Chhattisgarh was created in 2000.

Members of Vidhan Sabha
 Part of Madhya Pradesh Assembly 
 1950: Pran nath gada 
 1955: Madan lal bagdi
 1960: Ayodhya prasad sarma
 1965: Nemichand Jain, Indian National Congress
 1970: Purushotam lal koshik 
 1975: Yaqub rajwani 
 1980: Maksudan lal chandrakar Indian National Congress
 1985: Maksudan lal chandrakar Indian National Congress
 1990: Dau santosh agrawal
 1993: Agni chandrakar, Indian National Congress
 1998: Agni Chandrakar, Indian National Congress
 As part of Chhattisgarh State, since 2000
 2003: Poonam Chandrakar, Bharatiya Janata Party
 2008: Agni Chandrakar, Indian National Congress

Election results

2018

See also
 Mahasamund district
 List of constituencies of Chhattisgarh Legislative Assembly

References

Mahasamund district
Assembly constituencies of Chhattisgarh